Kruphaiomyces is a genus of fungi in the family Laboulbeniaceae. A monotypic genus, it contains the single species Kruphaiomyces trochoidei.

References

External links
Kruphaiomyces at Index Fungorum

Laboulbeniomycetes
Monotypic Laboulbeniomycetes genera